Armillaria puiggarii is a species of agaric fungus in the family Physalacriaceae. This species is found in Central and South America.

See also 
 List of Armillaria species

References 

puiggarii
Fungi described in 1889
Fungi of Central America
Fungal tree pathogens and diseases
Taxa named by Carlo Luigi Spegazzini
Fungi of South America